Al-Mosul Sports Club is an Iraqi football club based in Mosul that plays in the Iraq Division Two.

History
In the Iraqi Premier League 2007–08 season, Al-Mosul FC withdrew for security reasons. Hence they came back to the Iraqi Premier League without playing in the lower division. In the Iraqi Premier League 2008–09 season, the club announced their withdrawal, this time due to financial problems.

Honours
Iraq Division One
Winners (2): 1981–82, 2001–02

References

External links

Al-Mosul FC
Mosul
1957 establishments in Iraq
Football clubs in Nineveh